The Rawson Estate is a historic estate house at 41 Vernon Street in Newton, Massachusetts.  The -story wood-frame house was built c. 1860, and is a well-preserved surviving specimen of an Italianate estate house, a form which was once more common in the Newton Corner area.  It has a symmetrical appearance, with a projecting central section with a gable in which a round-arch window is set.  The front porch has ornate decorative wood trim.  The house was built by Daniel Rawson, a boot and shoe merchant, and was once part of a much larger landholding of the Rawsons.

The house was listed on the National Register of Historic Places in 1986.

See also
 National Register of Historic Places listings in Newton, Massachusetts

References

Houses on the National Register of Historic Places in Newton, Massachusetts
Italianate architecture in Massachusetts
Houses completed in 1860